Nicolae Onică (born 24 June 1993) is a Romanian weightlifter.

He participated at the 2018 World Weightlifting Championships, winning a medal..He is also european champion in 2018 in 94 kg category.

References

External links

IWRP profile

1993 births
Living people
Romanian male weightlifters
World Weightlifting Championships medalists
European Weightlifting Championships medalists
20th-century Romanian people
21st-century Romanian people